The following is the list of squads that took part in the men's water polo tournament at the 1972 Summer Olympics.

Australia
The following players represented Australia:

 Michael Withers
 Tom Hoad
 David Woods
 Peter Montgomery
 Ian McLauchlain
 Robert Menzies
 David Neesham
 Les Nunn
 Nicky Barnes
 Leon Wiegard
 Bill Tilley

Bulgaria
The following players represented Bulgaria:

 Biser Naumov
 Ivan Kovachev
 Aleksandar Shintser
 Toma Tomov
 Plamen Brankov
 Mladen Khristov
 Nedelcho Yordanov
 Vasil Tomov
 Andrey Konstantinov
 Matey Popov
 Lyubomir Runtov

Canada
The following players represented Canada:

 William Van der Pol
 Alan Pyle
 Rick Pugliese
 Clifford Barry
 Donald Packer
 Stephen Hart
 Jack Gauldie
 Robert Thompson
 David Hart
 Gabor Csepregi
 Guy Leclerc

Cuba
The following players represented Cuba:

 Oscar Periche
 David Rodríguez
 Jorge Rizo
 Guillermo Martínez Ginoris
 Orlando Cowley
 Eugenio Almenteros
 Carlos Sánchez
 Gerardo Rodríguez
 Osvaldo García
 Guillermo Cañete
 Jesús Pérez

Greece
The following players represented Greece:

 Dimitrios Konstas
 Georgios Theodorakopoulos
 Evangelos Voultsos
 Kyriakos Iosifidis
 Dimitrios Kougevetopoulos
 Periklis Damaskos
 Thomas Karalogos
 Ioannis Karalogos
 Efstathios Sarantos
 Ioannis Palios
 Panagiotis Mikhalos

Hungary
The following players represented Hungary:

 Endre Molnár
 Tibor Cservenyák
 András Bodnár
 István Görgényi
 Zoltán Kásás
 Tamás Faragó
 László Sárosi
 István Szivós Jr.
 István Magas
 Dénes Pócsik
 Ferenc Konrád

Italy
The following players represented Italy:

 Alberto Alberani Samaritani
 Eraldo Pizzo
 Roldano Simeoni
 Mario Cevasco
 Alessandro Ghibellini
 Gianni De Magistris
 Guglielmo Marsili
 Silvio Baracchini
 Franco Lavoratori
 Sante Marsili
 Ferdinando Lignano

Japan
The following players represented Japan:

 Yukiharu Oshita
 Hirokatsu Kuwayama
 Toshio Takahashi
 Shuzo Yajima
 Hiroshi Hashimoto
 Koji Nakano
 Naoto Minegishi
 Tatsuo Jihira
 Takashi Kimura
 Yoshihiro Yasumi
 Toru Arase

Mexico
The following players represented Mexico:

 Daniel Gómez
 Francisco García
 Maximiliano Aguilar
 Raúl Alanis
 Arturo Valencia
 Juan Manuel García
 Armando Fernández
 Alfredo Sauza
 Ricardo Chapa
 Víctor García
 Rafael Azpeitia

Netherlands
The following players represented the Netherlands:

 Evert Kroon
 Hans Wouda
 Jan Evert Veer
 Hans Hoogveld
 Wim Hermsen
 Hans Parrel
 Ton Schmidt
 Mart Bras
 Ton Buunk
 Gijze Stroboer
 Wim van de Schilde

Romania
The following players represented Romania:

 Şerban Huber
 Bogdan Mihăilescu
 Gheorghe Zamfirescu
 Gruia Novac
 Dinu Popescu
 Claudiu Rusu
 Iosif Culineac
 Cornel Rusu
 Viorel Rus
 Radu Lazăr
 Cornel Frăţilă

Soviet Union
The following players represented the Soviet Union:

 Vadim Gulyayev
 Anatoly Akimov
 Aleksandr Dreval
 Aleksandr Dolgushin
 Vladimir Zhmudsky
 Aleksandr Kabanov
 Oleksiy Barkalov
 Aleksandr Shidlovsky
 Nikolay Melnikov
 Leonid Osipov
 Viacheslav Sobchenko

Spain
The following players represented Spain:

 Salvador Franch
 Juan Rubio
 Juan Sans
 Juan Jané
 Alfonso Cánovas
 Gabriel Soler
 Poncio Puigdevall
 Enrique Guardia
 José Padrós
 Gaspar Ventura
 Luis Bestit

United States
The following players represented the United States:

 James Slatton
 Stan Cole
 Russ Webb
 Barry Weitzenberg
 Gary Sheerer
 Bruce Bradley
 Peter Asch
 Jim Ferguson
 Steve Barnett
 John Parker
 Eric Lindroth

West Germany
The following players represented West Germany:

 Gerd Olbert
 Hermann Haverkamp
 Peter Teicher
 Kurt Küpper
 Günter Wolf
 Ingulf Nossek
 Ludger Weeke
 Kurt Schuhmann
 Jürgen Stiefel
 Hans Simon
 Hans Hoffmeister

Yugoslavia
The following players represented Yugoslavia:

 Karlo Stipanić
 Ratko Rudić
 Ozren Bonačić
 Uroš Marović
 Ronald Lopatni
 Zoran Janković
 Siniša Belamarić
 Dušan Antunović
 Đorđe Perišić
 Mirko Sandić
 Miloš Marković

References

1972